José de Jesús Corona Rodríguez (born 26 January 1981) is a Mexican professional footballer who plays as a goalkeeper and captains for Liga MX club Cruz Azul.

Corona is an Olympic gold medalist, captaining Mexico at the 2012 Summer Olympics.

Club career

Atlas
Corona started his career in Atlas in 2002. On 26 February 2003, in week five of the season, Corona made his official league debut against UNAM in a 2–1 win. Corona played 47 games with Atlas from 2002 to 2004.

Tecos
Corona was later transferred to Tecos UAG in the 2004 summer transfer window. He made his league debut playing a full 90 minutes against América. Corona was then loaned to Guadalajara for the 2005 edition of the Copa Libertadores as they reached the semifinals. He is well remembered for his stunning performance against Boca Juniors. Corona had an impressive final season with Tecos before leaving.

Cruz Azul
On 16 June 2009, Corona was transferred to Cruz Azul for €2.8 million, with whom he signed a three-year contract. Corona made his league debut with Cruz Azul on 2 August 2009 against Pumas in a 3–0 win, earning his first clean sheet with the club. That same year, he helped Cruz Azul reach the league final against Monterrey, where they finished as runners-up after losing both matches of the finals.

Corona played the last 2 games of the Clausura 2013 Copa MX, including the final against Atlante in a match which was scoreless at the end of regulation. Cruz Azul went on to win the game in penalties, giving them their first title in 16 years. Corona was a key figure during the 2013–14 CONCACAF Champions League as Cruz Azul was crowned champions of the tournament for the sixth time in its team history, qualifying them for the 2014 FIFA Club World Cup. Corona played all three matches of that competition, and Cruz Azul finished in fourth place after suffering a 4–0 defeat against Real Madrid and losing to Auckland City in penalties. On 9 May 2015, Corona made his 200th league appearance with Cruz Azul in the last match of the 2014–15 Liga MX season against Leones Negros in a 2–0 loss. Although Cruz Azul had a poor season, Corona was named one of the best goalkeepers in the league with 60 saves and 4 clean sheets at the end of the Clausura 2016.

On 30 July 2016, Corona stopped a penalty kick against Monterrey before they scored two minutes later, ending the match in a 1–1 draw. This ended his two-game streak of clean sheets on the third week of the season. On 30 May 2021, Corona finally won his first Liga MX title with Cruz Azul vs Santos Laguna winning 2–1 on aggregate. This also ended Cruz Azul's 23-year championship drought when at the time, they won it in 1997.

International career
Corona was part of the Mexico U23 at the 2004 Summer Olympics.

Corona was called up to represent Mexico at the 2006 FIFA World Cup as the second-choice goalkeeper. He did not play in any of Mexico's four games.

In 2007, former coach Hugo Sánchez included him in the 23-man squad for the CONCACAF Gold Cup as the third-choice goalkeeper.

Corona looked to be one of the three goalkeepers for Mexico at the 2010 FIFA World Cup, however, after an alleged violent incident where Corona severely assaulted another man in Guadalajara, Javier Aguirre decided to omit him from the world cup roster.

Corona was originally chosen to represent Mexico in the 2011 Gold Cup as one of the goalkeepers, but after he participated in a fight in the second leg of the semi-finals of the Clausura 2011 between his team, Cruz Azul, and Monarcas Morelia, José Manuel de la Torre, coach of the national team, decided to cut him from the squads participating in the Gold Cup and the 2011 Copa América due to violent conduct. He was replaced in the squads by Jonathan Orozco. Corona also was suspended for the first six games in the 2011 Apertura season. Yosgart Gutiérrez replaced the suspended Corona during that period.

Corona was named as one of the three overag players for Mexico at the 2012 Summer Olympics. He was also named as the captain of the squad throughout the tournament. He helped the team reach the final, where they defeated Brazil 2–1 to win their first ever medal, the gold medal, at Wembley Stadium.

On 2 June 2014, Corona was named in Mexico's squad for the 2014 World Cup in Brazil as second-choice goalkeeper; he did not feature in any of Mexico's matches.

On 28 March 2015, Corona was first-choice goalkeeper for a friendly match against Ecuador. Corona made incredible saves in a game where Ecuador put over six shots on target, his most impressive save arguably the save of a penalty. Mexico won the match in a narrow 1–0 victory at a sold-out Los Angeles Coliseum.

On 17 May 2015, Corona became the first-choice goalkeeper over Alfredo Talavera and Melitón Hernández to represent Mexico at the 2015 Copa America. On 12 June 2015, he played all 90 minutes against Bolivia in a 0–0 draw. He was later named captain of the squad for the remainder of the tournament after Rafael Márquez suffered an injury.

In May 2018, Corona was named in Mexico's preliminary 28-man squad for the World Cup, and was ultimately included in the final 23-man roster. He did not play in any of the matches.

Career statistics

Honours
Cruz Azul
Liga MX: Guardianes 2021
Copa MX: Clausura 2013, Apertura 2018
Campeón de Campeones: 2021
Supercopa de la Liga MX: 2022
Supercopa MX: 2019
CONCACAF Champions League: 2013–14
Leagues Cup: 2019

Mexico Youth
Central American and Caribbean Games: Silver Medal 2002
Pan American Games:
Gold medalist: 2011
Bronze medalist: 2003
CONCACAF Olympic Qualifying Championship: 2004
Olympic Gold Medal: 2012

Mexico
CONCACAF Gold Cup: 2009

Individual
Mexican Primera División Rookie of the Tournament: Clausura 2003
Mexican Primera División Golden Glove: Clausura 2009, Apertura 2010, Clausura 2012, 2020–21
Liga MX Best XI: Guardianes 2021

References

External links

 
 
 
 
 
 

1981 births
Living people
Footballers at the 2004 Summer Olympics
2005 FIFA Confederations Cup players
2005 CONCACAF Gold Cup players
2006 FIFA World Cup players
2007 CONCACAF Gold Cup players
2009 CONCACAF Gold Cup players
Footballers at the 2011 Pan American Games
Footballers at the 2012 Summer Olympics
2013 FIFA Confederations Cup players
2014 FIFA World Cup players
2015 Copa América players
Copa América Centenario players
2017 CONCACAF Gold Cup players
Footballers from Guadalajara, Jalisco
Liga MX players
Atlas F.C. footballers
Tecos F.C. footballers
C.D. Guadalajara footballers
Cruz Azul footballers
Olympic footballers of Mexico
Mexico international footballers
Association football goalkeepers
CONCACAF Gold Cup-winning players
Olympic gold medalists for Mexico
Olympic medalists in football
Mexico youth international footballers
Medalists at the 2012 Summer Olympics
Pan American Games gold medalists for Mexico
Pan American Games medalists in football
Mexican footballers
2018 FIFA World Cup players
Central American and Caribbean Games silver medalists for Mexico
Competitors at the 2002 Central American and Caribbean Games
Central American and Caribbean Games medalists in football
Medalists at the 2011 Pan American Games